Noah Wunsch (born 1970 in Rendsburg) is a German painter, photographer, and designer.

Life
The artist Noah Wunsch studied design at the well-known, Hamburg based artist Ursula Unbehaun. He attended the University for Music and Art in Vienna, Austria. As a photographer, he was taught by Christoph Rüdt von Collenberg and Wolfgang Klein. Later he studied acting, music and dancing at the Stella-Academy in Hamburg. Noah Wunsch is living and always travelling between Paris, Hamburg, New York City and California. The artist is known for his charity support.

Paintings

The artist focuses on very big and colourful paintings, also altar paintings for churches. The Picasso-organizer Thierry de la Fontaine considered his work "to be full of energy and fruitfulness. From it comes a real light, both from within and from a spiritual point of view!". Some of his paintings, that he created in Mexico, France, USA, Germany or Italy are up to 12 m long and considered to be of high value. One of history the biggest paintings of almost 200 meters has been created by Noah Wunsch and attracted a huge number of visitors at the world heritage site Royal Saltworks at Arc-et-Senans in France. His deep faith inspired the artist to create a bible for children with his images. Worldwide, the painter has shown his work in many exhibitions, from Vienna, Hamburg, Toulouse, Madrid, Chicago, New York City to Mexico.

Photography
As a photographer, Noah Wunsch created portraits of many celebrities, like David Copperfield, Richard von Weizsäcker. John Neumeier, Claudia Schiffer and Diana Ross. As a photographer. Noah Wunsch worked on the fashion shows in Paris for labels like Yves St. Laurent, Chanel and Karl Lagerfeld. His pictures, published by well-known companies like Gruner & Jahr, Jahreszeiten-Verlag, Bauer Verlag and Mont Blanc, are characterized by clarity and sensibility for the small details.

Fashion
Since 2006 Noah Wunsch is also successful as a fashion designer. His work is considered as glamorous and free of any fashion trend. So far he seems to create pieces only for a small, exclusive audience.

References

1970 births
20th-century German painters
20th-century German male artists
German male painters
21st-century German painters
21st-century German male artists
German fashion designers
Fashion photographers
Living people
Artists from Hamburg
Photographers from Hamburg